Lucas Araújo de Oliveira (born 21 May 1999), known as Lucas Araújo, is a Brazilian professional footballer who plays as a midfielder for Bahia.

Professional career
Lucas Araújo joined the youth academy of Grêmio in 2012. He made his professional debut with Grêmio in a 1-0 Campeonato Gaúcho win over Pelotas on 8 March 2020.

On 7 April 2021, Lucas Araújo signed a contract with fellow Série A side Bahia until December 2023.

Honours
Grêmio
Campeonato Gaúcho: 2020

Bahia
Copa do Nordeste: 2021

Sampaio Corrêa
Campeonato Maranhense: 2022

References

External links
 
 Grêmio Profile

1999 births
Living people
Sportspeople from Fortaleza
Brazilian footballers
Association football midfielders
Campeonato Brasileiro Série A players
Campeonato Brasileiro Série B players
Grêmio Foot-Ball Porto Alegrense players
Esporte Clube Bahia players
Sampaio Corrêa Futebol Clube players